Khalkhalian (also Romanized as Khalkhālīān) is a village in Dinachal Rural District, Pareh Sar District, Rezvanshahr County, Gilan Province, Iran. At the 2006 census, its population was 648, in 174 families.

References 

Populated places in Rezvanshahr County